Listen to the Radio is the twelfth studio album by American country music artist Don Williams. It was released on March 26, 1982 via MCA Records. The albums includes the singles "Listen to the Radio". "Mistakes" and "If Hollywood Don't Need You (Honey I Still Do)".

Track listing

Chart performance

References

1982 albums
Don Williams albums
Albums produced by Garth Fundis
MCA Records